Romane Lewis Clark  (December 3, 1925 – 2007) was an American philosopher and Professor Emeritus of Philosophy at Indiana University, Bloomington. He is known for his works on logic, especially his eponymous paradox (Clark's paradox).

Books
 Introduction to Logic, Romane Clark and Paul Welsh, D. Van Nostrana Company, Inc., Princeton, N.J., Toronto, New York, London, 1962.

References

21st-century American philosophers
Philosophy academics
2007 deaths
Indiana University Bloomington faculty
American logicians
1925 births
People from Waverly, Iowa
University of Iowa alumni